Jamie Nicholls may refer to:
 Jamie Nicholls (politician)
 Jamie Nicholls (snowboarder)

See also
 James Nicholls (disambiguation)